The discography of American hip hop recording artist Yelawolf consists of seven studio albums, five collaborative albums, six mixtapes, nine EPs, 50 singles (including sixteen as a featured artist) and 82 music videos. His music has been released on record labels Interscope Records, Shady Records and DGC Records, including independent record label Ghet-O-Vision and Slumerican which has released some of his independent material.

Studio albums

Collaborative albums

EPs

Mixtapes

Singles

As lead artist

As featured artist

Other charted songs

Guest appearances

Music videos

Notes

References

Discographies of American artists
Hip hop discographies